The Calgary Roughnecks are a lacrosse team based in Calgary playing in the National Lacrosse League (NLL). The 2012 season was the 11th in franchise history.

Regular season

Conference standings

Game log
Reference:

Playoffs

Game logs
Reference:

Transactions

Trades

Dispersal Draft
The Roughnecks chose the following players in the Boston Blazers dispersal draft:

Entry draft
The 2011 NLL Entry Draft took place on September 21, 2011. The Roughnecks selected the following players:

Roster

See also
2012 NLL season

References

Calgary
Calgary Roughnecks seasons